For the concept in business, see Blue Ocean Strategy.

Red Ocean is a 2007 first-person shooter video game developed by German company Collision Studios.

Plot
Jack Hard hires a fellow diver to explore an old World War II submarine. He soon finds that there is an entrance to an underground complex nearby. An operative contacts him over the radio telling him that his fellow diver is actually a member of the CIA. Jack then soon finds him dead and must take up the fight. The plot takes place in an abandoned, underwater, secret Soviet base that has been taken over by terrorists.

Gameplay
In much the same vein as Far Cry and other games of the genre, Red Ocean could be considered a traditional first-person shooter. The game tries to introduce some innovative elements like water effects including rooms that flood and underwater diving sequences.

Reception

Red Ocean received mixed reviews from critics upon release. On GameRankings, the game holds a score of 43.50% based on two reviews.

The game was awarded the 2007 German Developer Award "Deutscher Entwicklerpreis" in the category for "Best German Action Game".

References

External links
 Publisher site
 German Developer Award

2007 video games
Shooter video games
Windows games
Windows-only games
Gamebryo games
Video games developed in Germany
DTP Entertainment games
Single-player video games